George A. Brown (1885–1940) was a Scottish businessman, and manager of the Rangoon Times from 1915 up until his death in 1940. He was also a prominent freemason. He attended Glasgow High School and was apprenticed as an accountant in Glasgow before being appointed to an accounting firm in Yangon (Rangoon) in 1906. He worked there, and later with a tin-mining company in the region, before becoming the manager of the Rangoon Times in 1915. He died in 1940 in Yangon under unknown circumstances.

References

20th-century Scottish businesspeople
Scottish accountants
Businesspeople from Glasgow
1885 births
1940 deaths
Scottish people of the British Empire
British newspaper executives
People educated at the High School of Glasgow
20th-century Burmese businesspeople
British people in British Burma